Little Hall Island (also known as: Hall Smaller Island) is a Baffin Island offshore island located in the Arctic Archipelago in the territory of Nunavut. The island lies in the Labrador Sea a few kilometers north of its confluence with Davis Strait. Other islands also in the immediate vicinity of the tip of Hall Peninsula include the Harper Islands, Lefferts Island, Bear Island, and Hudson Island.

References 

Uninhabited islands of Qikiqtaaluk Region
Islands of Baffin Island
Islands of the Labrador Sea